Ferny Grove could refer to:

Ferny Grove, Queensland, a suburb of Brisbane in Australia
Ferny Grove railway line
Ferny Grove railway station
Ferny Grove State High School
Electoral district of Ferny Grove